Events of 2019 in Iraq.

Events 
March  21: Mosul ferry sinking
August 20: Popular Mobilisation, a Shia-dominated military group, blames the United States and Israel for an explosion at Balad airbase in Salahuddin province, about 80 km (50 miles) north of Baghdad.
October 1: 2019 Iraqi Protests

Deaths 

January 18 - Lamia Al-Gailani Werr, 80, Iraqi archaeologist.
January 28 - Tahseen Said, 86, Iraqi politician, Mir of the Yazidis (since 1944).
February 2 - Alaa Mashzoub, 50, Iraqi novelist and writer, expert on the History of the Jews in Iraq, shot.
May 3 - George Hanna, 90, Iraqi-American basketball player.
May 13 - Kochavi Shemesh, 75, Iraqi-born Israeli lawyer and social activist, leader of the Black Panthers protest movement. 
26 May  - Qays Abd al-Hussein al-Yasiri, 78, Iraqi media scholar, academic and poet.
July 7 - Mohammad Hussaini Shahroudi, 93, Iraqi Marja'.
October 29 - Safaa Al Sarai, 26, activist

References

 
2010s in Iraq
Years of the 21st century in Iraq
Iraq
Iraq